Sima Diab (Damascus, November 1979) is a Syrian-American photographer and press photographer who has portrayed the civil war in her country, Syria.

Her career as a photographer started in 2006 and she has been a professional photographer since 2013. Her works have been published in the most important English-language newspapers English around the world, like The New York Times, The Guardian, The Daily Telegraph, and others.

She was a grantee in the 2015 Arab Documentary Photography Program from the Arab Fund for Arts and Culture/ Prince Claus Fund / Magnum Foundation.

Studies and early career 
Sima Diab was born in November 1979, in Damascus, capital of Syria. She was educated in the United States and Syria, returning to the Middle East permanently in 2002 after finishing her university education in the US. She began to travel with her camera by 2006 and visited the Near East. She settled in Egypt in 2007 and is based in Cairo.

Professional career 
Her photographs focus on features, social documentaries about daily life and conditions in the Arab diaspora and the Arab world.

Diab is recognised for her photographic works, considered very personal and committed, on the Syrian Civil War and on the Syrian population. She mixes emotions and movements to convey her own experience of the facts.

In 2015 she began a project about the hard life on the Serbo-Hungarian migratory route before Hungary closed its borders. She reflects the urgency of finding shelter, of finding a new border crossing between Serbia and Croatia, the fear and the embarrassment. The pictures reveal her subjects' uncertainty and need to build another life.

She is a member of the Frontline Freelance Register and of the National Press Photographers Association (NPPA).

Recognitions 
She won 2016 James Foley Award for Conflict Reporting from the Online News Association

She won American Photography's Best of Photography 2015 AP32. She has been granted in the 2015 Arab Documentary Photography Program from Arab Fund for Arts and Culture (AFAC), Prince Claus Fund and Foundation Magnum.

Exhibitions 
Most important exhibitions: 
 Viral: Photography in the Age of Social Average, United Kingdom 
 EverydayClimateChange: Milan Exhibition, Expo 2015 in Milan
 EverydayClimateChange: Photoville 2015, New York City
 Exhibition Chemins d'exil / Ways of exile. Institut Français Espagne 2016, Madrid

References

External links 
 Sima Diab - Website
 Sima Diab - Instagram
 Sima Diab - Profile in Twitter
 Sima Diab - Profile in Frontline Freelance Register

American photojournalists
1979 births
20th-century American photographers
Living people
20th-century American women photographers
21st-century American women
Women photojournalists